Niles station is an Amtrak intercity train station in Niles, Michigan. The station is served by three daily Wolverine round trips and one daily Blue Water round trip. It is located on the Michigan Line (the former Michigan Central Railroad mainline), east of the former Benton Harbor Branch crossing and west of the former junctions with the South Bend and Air Line Branches. The station building was constructed by the Michigan Central in 1892 to a design by architects Spier and Rohns. It is listed on the National Register of Historic Places as Michigan Central Railroad Niles Depot.

Niles station was used as a filming location for Continental Divide, Midnight Run, and Only the Lonely, the latter of which spawned an annual tradition of adding Christmas lights and decorations around the station.

References

External links

Niles Amtrak Station (USA Rail Guide—Train Web)
Michigan Central Railroad Company / Depot (The Michigan Historical Marker Web Site)
Niles Station (Great Railroad Stations Index)

1892 establishments in Michigan
Amtrak stations in Michigan
Michigan State Historic Sites
Niles, Michigan
Railway stations on the National Register of Historic Places in Michigan
Railway stations in the United States opened in 1892
Michigan Line
Transportation in Berrien County, Michigan
National Register of Historic Places in Berrien County, Michigan
Former Michigan Central Railroad stations